Proteolix, Inc., was a private biotechnology company with headquarters in South San Francisco, California.  Proteolix was founded in 2003 based on technology developed by co-founders Dr. Craig Crews (Yale University) and Dr. Raymond J. Deshaies (California Institute of Technology). Drs. Susan Molineaux and Phil Whitcome (deceased) joined Drs. Crews and Deshaies as co-founders. Proteolix was launched based on an $18.2 million A round comprising investments by Latterell Venture Partners, US Venture Partners, Advanced Technology Ventures, and The Vertical Group. Proteolix focused primarily on the proteasome as a therapeutic target.  Its lead product candidate, carfilzomib (PR-171), is a tetrapeptide epoxyketone.  At the time of its sale (see below), the company had two earlier-stage programs, an orally-bioavailable proteasome inhibitor for oncology (PR-047), and an agent preferentially targeting the immuno form of the proteasome (PR-957), with potential utility in areas such as rheumatoid arthritis.  At the time of sale, Carfilzomib's route of administration was intravenous, and the company was exploring its potential utility in multiple myeloma, Non-Hodgkin lymphoma (NHL) and other cancers.

Proteolix was acquired by Onyx Pharmaceuticals in 2009 for $810 million (nominal value).  Onyx renamed PR-047 to "ONX 0912" and PR-957 to "ONX 0914".

External links
Proteolix's corporate website

Biotechnology companies of the United States
Companies based in South San Francisco, California
Life sciences industry